Mount Kirkpatrick is a lofty, generally ice-free mountain in Antarctica's Queen Alexandra Range. Located 8 km (5 mi) west of Mount Dickerson, Mount Kirkpatrick is the highest point in the Queen Alexandra Range, as well as in its parent range, the Transantarctic Mountains. Discovered and named by the British Antarctic Expedition (1907–1909), the mountain was named for a Glasgow businessman, who was one of the original supporters of the expedition. Mount Kilpatrick is an alternate name for this mountain.

Mount Kirkpatrick as a fossil site
 
Mount Kirkpatrick holds one of the most important fossil sites in Antarctica, the Hanson Formation. Because Antarctica used to be warmer and supported dense conifer and cycad forest, and because all the continents were fused into a giant supercontinent called Pangaea, many ancient Antarctic wildlife share relatives elsewhere in the world. Among these creatures are tritylodonts, herbivorous mammal-like reptiles that are prevalent elsewhere at the time. A crow-sized pterosaur has been identified. In addition to these finds, numerous dinosaur remains have been uncovered. Fossils of dinosaurs resembling Plateosaurus, Coelophysis, and Dilophosaurus were excavated. Mount Kirkpatrick holds the first dinosaur scientifically named on the continent: the large predatory Cryolophosaurus. In 2004, scientists have even found partial remains of a large sauropod plant-eating dinosaur.

See also
 List of fossil sites (with link directory)
 Paper (Smith, N.D. and Pol, D. 2007) on Glacialisaurus hammeri

References

Mountains of the Ross Dependency
Four-thousanders of Antarctica
Mount Kirkpatrick
Mount Kirkpatrick